Polysitos is a settlement in the Vistonida municipal unit, Xanthi regional unit of Greece.  According to the 2011 census, the population was 403 inhabitants.

References

Populated places in Xanthi (regional unit)